The 1890–91 season was the 20th season of competitive football in England.

Events
Everton started the 1890–91 season in superb form with five straight victories, with Fred Geary scoring in each of the first six matches. By mid-January, Everton had completed all but one of their fixtures and were on 29 points, while Preston North End were eleven points adrift with seven games still to play. Everton then had to sit out the next two months as Preston completed their fixture list until they were only two points adrift with one match each left to play. Both teams played their final games of the season on 14 March, with Everton losing 3–2 at Burnley (Geary scored both Everton goals) and Preston going down 3–0 at Sunderland. Everton were thus able to win the Football League Championship for the first time, by a margin of two points with fourteen victories from their 22 league games.

National team
In the 1891 British Home Championship, for the second time England played matches against Wales and Ireland on the same day, 7 March 1891, winning both comfortably.

Wales
England awarded six new caps for the Welsh game, including the Everton left wing pairing of Edgar Chadwick and Alf Milward. For three of the débutantes, Leonard Wilkinson (goalkeeper) of Oxford University, Thomas Porteous of Sunderland and Elphinstone Jackson of Oxford University, this was their single England appearance. The final débutante was Albert Smith of Nottingham Forest, who made the first of 3 appearances at right-half.

Ireland
For the Irish match, for which England selected a predominantly Midlands based team, another five players made their debut, of which Joseph Marsden of Darwen and Jem Bayliss of West Bromwich Albion (both defenders) were not selected again. The other débutantes were Alf Underwood of Stoke at left-back, George Cotterill of Cambridge University, who made the first of 4 appearances at centre-forward (scoring on his debut) and fellow forward Arthur Henfrey (Corinthian) (who also scored on his debut).  This was also Tinsley Lindley's final England appearance, which he marked by scoring 2 goals, as England were comfortable  6–1 victors.

Scotland
Scotland also beat Wales and Ireland, so, once again, the England v. Scotland match, played at Ewood Park, Blackburn on 6 April 1891, was the championship decider. England selected an experienced team including four players from the Everton side who had recently won the Football League championship, although, rather surprisingly considering the venue, no players were selected from the Blackburn Rovers side who had won the FA Cup in the final on 21 March. England took an early lead and were 2–0 up at half time and, although Scotland pulled a goal back through Frank Watt late in the game, England managed to hang on in a close game to clinch victory and the championship.

* England score given first

Key
 H = Home match
 BHC = British Home Championship

League tables

The Football League

The Football Alliance

References

External links
Details of England v Wales game
Details of England v Ireland game
Details of England v Scotland game
British Home Championship results on RSSF